Katherine Sprague Squibb (May 10, 1949 – August 18, 2018) was an American toxicologist who specialized in metal toxicity. She was a faculty member at the University of Maryland School of Medicine and served as co-director of the University System of Maryland's graduate program in toxicology.

Life 
Katherine Anne Sprague was born May 10, 1949 in New Brunswick, New Jersey. She is the daughter of agronomist  and homemaker Margarete Hardegen Sprauge. Raised in the Dayton section of South Brunswick, Squibb graduated from South Brunswick High School. She majored in biochemistry at University of Wisconsin–Madison, graduating in 1971. Squibb married fellow toxicologist  on August 21, 1971. Squibb completed a master's and Ph.D. (1977) in biochemistry at Rutgers University. Her dissertation was titled Control of hepatic metallothionein synthesis by zinc and cadmium. She was a postdoctoral researcher at the National Institute of Environmental Health Sciences.

In 1984, Squibb joined the New York University Medical Center's Institute of Environmental Medicine. In 1993, she joined the department of medicine at the University of Maryland School of Medicine. She worked as the co-director of the University System of Maryland's graduate program in toxicology. Squibb led research on metal toxicity "and metabolism elucidated ways in which metals such as cadmium, lead, and depleted uranium target specific organ systems." In the fall of 2015, Squibb received the achievement graduate education award from the University of Maryland's graduate program in life sciences.

Squibb had a daughter and son. She died August 18, 2018 in Columbia, Maryland of Alzheimer's disease.

References

Citations

Bibliography 

1949 births
2018 deaths
People from New Brunswick, New Jersey
People from South Brunswick, New Jersey
Scientists from New Jersey
University of Wisconsin–Madison alumni
Rutgers University alumni
South Brunswick High School (New Jersey) alumni
New York University faculty
University of Maryland School of Medicine faculty
American toxicologists
20th-century American women scientists
21st-century American women scientists
Deaths from Alzheimer's disease